This list of tallest buildings in Connecticut ranks the tallest skyscrapers in Connecticut by height, that stand at least .

Tallest buildings and structures

Tallest under construction, approved and proposed 
This lists buildings that are under construction, approved for construction or proposed for construction in Connecticut.

* Table entries with dashes (—) indicate that information regarding building heights, floor counts, or dates of completion has not yet been released.

See also
Cathedral of St. Joseph (Hartford, Connecticut)
List of tallest buildings in Hartford
List of tallest buildings in New Haven

References

Connecticut
Tallest